DHM may refer to:

 Deutsche Harmonia Mundi or DHM, a record label
 Deputy head of mission or DHM, an abbreviation used in Europe to refer to the number-two diplomat assigned to an embassy or other diplomatic mission. 
 Deutsches Historisches Museum or DHM, a museum in Berlin
 Digital holographic microscopy (DHM), a quantitative phase microscope
 ISO 639:dhm, language code for the Zemba language in Angola
 Acronym for Dihydromyricetin
 DHM, the IATA code for Dharamsala airport, in Himachal Pradesh, India
 Acronym for Directed Health Measure
 DHM, station code for Dulwich Hill railway station in Dulwich Hill, South Wales, Australia 
 DHM, station code for Durham railway station in Durham, Northern England
 DHM, Amtrak station code for Durham-UNH (Amtrak station) in New Hampshire, United States